Bun Lai (born 1973) is a Hong Kong-born American chef. He is a leader in the sustainable food movement. His family restaurant, Miya's in New Haven, Connecticut, is the first sustainable sushi restaurant in the world. His mother, who received an award from U.S. Representative Rosa DeLauro for her contribution in sustainable seafood, is the founder of Miya's and his father is a Cambridge and Yale University-educated scientist and surgeon.

Bun Lai and Miya's has been featured in publications including National Geographic, Time, The New York Times, Prevention, EatingWell, Outside, Scientific American, The Atlantic, Food & Wine, The New Yorker, and Popular Mechanics.

Career
In 2001, Bun Lai initiated the removal from the menu of seafood that was caught or farmed in a way that was detrimental to the long term well-being of the harvested species or its habitats. Bun Lai is credited as the first chef in the world to implement a sustainable seafood paradigm to the cuisine of sushi. The sweet potato sushi roll, which Bun Lai created in 1995 at Miya's, is the California Roll of plant-based sushi. Today it can be found on sushi menus throughout the country. The use of brown rice — instead of white rice — and other whole grains for sushi, is also a Bun Lai innovation, which today is emulated throughout the world of sushi.

Chef Bun Lai created the first menu dedicated to the idea of using invasive species at Miya's in 2005, during which time half the menus invasive species offerings were conceptual because invasive species were not yet commercially available. The menu featured locally caught invasive species such as Asian shore crabs and European green crabs. The invasive species menu was created in order to take pressure off of popular over-fished species by utilizing ones, instead, that are abundant but ecologically destructive.
 Today, Miya's offers a plethora of invasive species such as Chesapeake blue catfish, Florida lionfish, Kentucky silver carp, Georgia cannonball jellyfish, and invasive edible plants such as Connecticut Japanese knotweed and Autumn olive. In 2013, Bun Lai's use of cicadas in sushi was satirized by Saturday Night Live, though in 2021 the New York Times praised his use of the insects as part of his mission "to encourage diners to eat in an environmentally conscious way."

Bun Lai is on the Council of Directors for the True Health Coalition/GLIMMER which was founded by Dr. David Katz (Director Yale University Prevention Research Center) and Dan Buettner (Director Blue Zones Project). Bun Lai is the former Director of Nutrition for a non-for-profit that serves low income diabetics.

Bun Lai has authored papers which were published in Scientific American and Harvard Design Magazine. He is a sought after educator who has spoken at the White House and as a keynote for organizations such as The American Fisheries Society and the World Wildlife Fund at the National Geographic Society. He appeared on a season 8 episode of Chopped; he was eliminated in the first round after he cut himself and accidentally contaminated his dishes.

Accolades
2018 James Beard Foundation Broadcast Media Documentary Finalist, Blind Sushi 
White House Champion of Change for Sustainable Seafood Award
2013 James Beard Foundation Nominee: Best Chef Northeast
An EcoSalon 11 Most Influential Chefs in the U.S.
New Haven 50 Most Influential Person
Huffington Post Greatest Person of the Day
Recipient of the Yale Elm-Ivy Award.

References

1973 births
Living people
American chefs
People from New Haven, Connecticut
American people of Hong Kong descent
Sustainability advocates